Stefano Russo (born 29 June 2000) is a German professional footballer who plays as a defensive midfielder for Waldhof Mannheim.

Career
Russo made his professional debut for Waldhof Mannheim in the 3. Liga on 21 April 2021, coming on as a substitute in the 73rd minute for Dominik Martinović against 1. FC Saarbrücken. The away match finished as a 5–0 loss for Mannheim.

References

External links
 
 
 
 

2000 births
Living people
Sportspeople from Ludwigshafen
Footballers from Rhineland-Palatinate
German footballers
Germany youth international footballers
Italian footballers
German sportspeople of Italian descent
Association football midfielders
FC Augsburg II players
SV Waldhof Mannheim players
3. Liga players
Regionalliga players